Monetary Financial Institutions (MFIs), as in a definition provided by the European Central Bank, are defined as central banks, resident credit institutions as defined in Community Law, and other resident financial institutions whose business is to take deposits or close substitutes for deposits from entities other than MFIs and, for their own account (at least in economic terms), to grant credits and/or make investments in securities. Money market funds are also classified as MFIs.

References

External links
Definition of MFI by the European Central Bank

Financial services organizations
Monetary policy of the European Union
National accounts